Richard Charles Flynn (2 November 1926 – 25 July 1949) was an Australian rules footballer who played with North Melbourne in the Victorian Football League (VFL). He was born in Broken Hill and died in Parkville.

His only senior appearance for North Melbourne came in the opening round of the 1946 VFL season, a 59-point win over St Kilda at Arden Street Oval. He was initially named as an emergency, but came into the team when Kevin Dynon pulled out with an injury.

Flynn was badly injured on 20 July 1949 when he crashed his car into the back of a truck. He died five days later in Royal Melbourne Hospital.

References

1926 births
Australian rules footballers from New South Wales
North Melbourne Football Club players
Road incident deaths in Victoria (Australia)
1949 deaths
People from Broken Hill, New South Wales